Hymenasplenium is one of three genera of ferns in the Aspleniaceae (spleenwort family), in the eupolypods II clade of the order Polypodiales. The others are Hemidictyum and Asplenium. Hymenasplenium was segregated because it is a natural grouping with differing rhizome morphology – dorsiventral v. radial for the rest of Asplenium, differing chromosome count – x=39 v. x=36 for the rest of Asplenium, and a clear monophyletic grouping based on genetic analysis. It was confirmed as a sister group to Asplenium in a 2015 molecular study of the genera.

Selected species
Hymenasplenium basiscopicum
Hymenasplenium cardiophyllum
Hymenasplenium cheilosorum
Hymenasplenium delitescens
Hymenasplenium hoffmannii
Hymenasplenium ikenoi
Hymenasplenium laetum
Hymenasplenium obtusifolium
Hymenasplenium ortegae
Hymenasplenium purpurascens
Hymenasplenium repandulum
Hymenasplenium riparium
Hymenasplenium triquetrum
Hymenasplenium unilaterale
Hymenasplenium volubile

References

Aspleniaceae
Fern genera